Marino Fattori (Cailungo, Borgo Maggiore, 25 March 1832 – San Marino, 27 April 1896) was a Sammarinese writer and politician. He was Captain Regent in 1873, 1882, 1887 and 1893 

He studied veterinary at the University of Bologna and also some courses of Latin and Greek. He worked as a teacher and published Ricordi storici della republica di S. Marino (1869).

References

External links
 Ricordi storici della republica di S. Marino

1832 births
1896 deaths
Sammarinese writers
Italian-language writers
Captains Regent of San Marino